Oxyurichthys notonema, commonly known as the threadfin mudgoby, is a species of goby endemic to the Indo-West Pacific.

References

Larson, H.K. and E.O. Murdy, 2001. Gobiidae. Gobies. p. 3578-3603. In K.E. Carpenter and V. Niem (eds.) FAO species identification guide for fishery purposes. The living marine resources of the Western Central Pacific. Vol. 6. Bony fishes part 4 (Labridae to Latimeriidae), estuarine crocodiles. FAO, Rome. 

notonema
Fish of the Pacific Ocean
Taxa named by Max Carl Wilhelm Weber
Fish described in 1909